Marshall Alan Wright (born April 13, 1976) is an American lawyer from Forrest City, Arkansas, who is a former Democratic member of the Arkansas House of Representatives.

References

1976 births
Living people
Democratic Party members of the Arkansas House of Representatives
Arkansas lawyers
People from St. Francis County, Arkansas
Politicians from Los Angeles
People from Little River County, Arkansas
Sam M. Walton College of Business alumni
University of Arkansas School of Law alumni
21st-century American politicians
American United Methodists